Simpson Harbour is a sheltered harbour of Blanche Bay, on the Gazelle Peninsula in the extreme north of New Britain. The former capital city of Rabaul is on its shores. 

The harbour is part of a huge flooded caldera, Rabaul caldera. The harbour is ringed by a number of volcanoes.

History
The Australian Naval and Military Expeditionary Force captured Rabaul during World War I after entering Simpson Harbour.

During World War II, the Imperial Japanese utilised the harbour as a major naval base. Approximately 65 Japanese ships were sunk in the harbour by Allied air attacks.

The surrender of the Japanese forces of New Guinea, New Britain, and the Solomon Islands took place on 6 September 1945 in a ceremony aboard the aircraft carrier . Representing the Japanese were General Hitoshi Imamura, Commander Eighth Area Army, and Admiral Jinichi Kusaka, Commander Southeast Area Fleet.

See also
Australian Naval and Military Expeditionary Force
Bombing of Rabaul (1942)
Bombing of Rabaul (November 1943)

References

External links
Pacific War Wrecks
Rapopo Plantation Resort - divesite

East New Britain Province